Britta Reimers (born 27 July 1971) is a German politician. For one term from 2009 until 2014 she served as a Member of the European Parliament (MEP) representing Germany. She served as a member of the Free Democratic Party, part of the Alliance of Liberals and Democrats for Europe.

During her time in Parliament she served as a Member of the Committee on Agriculture and Rural Development and the Committee on Fisheries.

Reimers trained as a farmer and lives on her dairy farm in Steinburg.

References

1971 births
Living people
Free Democratic Party (Germany) MEPs
German farmers
German women farmers
MEPs for Germany 2009–2014
21st-century women MEPs for Germany
People from Itzehoe